The 2021 Women's World Ice Hockey Championships was the 23rd such event organised by the International Ice Hockey Federation. Originally scheduled to comprise six tournaments across four divisions, the event was significantly curtailed due to the COVID-19 pandemic. On 18 November 2020, the IIHF announced the cancellation of the Divisions I, II and III tournaments at the recommendation of the IIHF COVID-19 Expert Group. Only the Top Division tournament was maintained, bringing the number of participating nations from 42 to 10. With only one tournament held, the standard system of promotion and relegation between divisions and groups was not implemented and each team remained in the tournament pool designated for the 2021 event at the 2022 championships.

Championship (Top Division)

The tournament was scheduled to be held in Halifax and Truro, Canada, from 6 to 16 May 2021. It was cancelled in Nova Scotia on 21 April 2021, with the IIHF and Hockey Canada looking for a new host for summer 2021. On 30 April 2021, the IIHF announced that the tournament took place between 20 and 31 August 2021. On 2 June 2021, Calgary was announced as the new host.

Division I

Division I Group A
The Division I Group A tournament was scheduled to be held in Angers, France, from 11 to 18 April 2021.

Division I Group B
The Division I Group B tournament was scheduled to be held in Beijing, China, from 8 to 14 April 2021.

Division II

Division II Group A
The Division II Group A tournament was scheduled to be held in Jaca, Spain, from 10 to 16 April 2021.

Division II Group B
The Division II Group B tournament was scheduled to be held in Zagreb, Croatia, from 7 to 13 March 2021.

 – Promoted from the 2020 Division III

Division III

The Division III tournament was scheduled to be held in Kaunas, Lithuania, from 15 to 21 March 2021.

 – Relegated from the 2020 Division II B

References

External links
Official website of IIHF

 
World Ice Hockey Championships – Women's
IIHF Women's World Ice Hockey Championships